Mabel Bowden Howard (18 April 1894 – 23 June 1972) was a well-known New Zealand trade unionist and politician. She was the first woman secretary of a predominantly male union (the Canterbury General Labourers' Union).

She was a Member of Parliament for the Labour Party from 1943 until 1969. In 1947 she became New Zealand's first woman cabinet minister when she was made Minister of Health and Minister in charge of Child Welfare. She is remembered for waving two large pairs of bloomers in Parliament in support of her successful campaign to have clothing sizes standardised.

Early life
Mabel Howard was born in Bowden, near Adelaide, Australia, on 18 April 1894. She moved to New Zealand with her father (Ted Howard) and sisters after her mother, Harriet Garard Goring, died in 1903. In 1908, after leaving school, she took a commercial course at the Christchurch Technical Institute.

Political career

Trade unions
Howard joined the Christchurch Socialist Party when still at the Christchurch Technical Institute. She entered the Trades Hall in 1911 as an office assistant for the Canterbury General Labourers' Union. In 1933, at the age of 39, she became the first woman to become secretary of a predominantly male union in New Zealand. In 1942, she was appointed national secretary of the New Zealand Federated Labourers' Union and was again the first woman to hold such a position.

Local body politics
Between 1933 and 1968, Howard was a councillor for Christchurch City Council for a total of 19 years: 1933–1935, 1938–1941, 1950–1958 and 1963–1968. Howard also served on the Christchurch Drainage Board and North Canterbury Hospital Board.

Member of Parliament

Mabel Howard hoped to be chosen to stand for the  after her father's death, and although she had local support, the Labour Party chose Christchurch mayor Robert Macfarlane.

In 1943, Mabel Howard was elected Member of Parliament for Christchurch East at a by-election, becoming the fifth female MP. She retained the seat at the 1943 general election, becoming the first woman MP to be re-elected.

In 1946 Mabel Howard became the Member of Parliament for the new  electorate, winning 75.2 percent of the vote. This was an outstanding result; a reflection of the high regard in which she was held. Howard's concern was for "women, the aged, the sick and the unfortunate" (5 September 1944). In Parliament, she was a "forthright" representative for her people, stating "I stand here and say what I honestly believe" (September 1961).

In Parliament in 1954, she waved two pairs of bloomers that were both labelled OS in front of an astonished House. She demonstrated that, although clothing was supposed to be in standard sizes and correctly labelled, much variation existed. The two pieces were quite clearly of differing sizes. Although opposed by clothing manufacturers, she received much support from the House, including from National Party members and standardisation was legislated. On another occasion, she threw a stone onto the floor of Parliament to illustrate what buyers of bagged coal may find. Before an election campaign in the early 1960s, she said she intended to campaign in a pair of slippers to demonstrate the difficulty in obtaining practical shoes for women: "Those offered all have extremely pointed toes and stiletto heels, which ruined footpaths and carpets".

Cabinet Minister

Howard became a Cabinet Minister only four years after entering Parliament. In 1947, she became Minister of Health and Child Welfare; the first woman Cabinet Minister in the Commonwealth outside of Britain. When the Labour Party was returned to office in 1957, Howard again achieved Cabinet rank as Minister of Social Security and Child Welfare and Minister for the Welfare of Women and Children. Harry Atmore, the Independent MP for Nelson, recognised Mabel Howard's contribution to New Zealand: "She is a real advocate for the women of this country and with the experience she has had – much wider than ladies of her age usually have – she can speak with authority".

Howard advocated for equal rights for women, especially equal pay, and campaigned on many issues including social security, the cost of living and housing. She stated that she "worked like a slave". She is quoted as saying:
I was in politics for a purpose – my very life was politics. I suppose this was because I was more manly than most women; that’s why I never married.

Community service
She worked as a volunteer for many organisations, among them St John's Ambulance and the Royal New Zealand Society for the Prevention of Cruelty to Animals (RNZSPCA). She successfully fought to enact the first Prevention of Cruelty to Animals Bill in 1960 and was president of the Canterbury branch of the RNZSPCA for nearly twenty years.

Later life
By the time the 1966 election campaign began Mabel Howard was clearly ill. Mel Courtney, a member of her campaign committee and later MP for Nelson (1976–81), ensured she was assisted at public appearances. Howard had helped his family in their hour of need and now he was helping her. Howard retired from politics at the 1969 election, after a lifetime of service to her community. The Labour Party had introduced a compulsory retirement age for MPs, which applied to Howard, who had already been showing signs of ageing. Once retired, she became increasingly isolated and paranoid, on top of the onset of dementia and pneumonia that she had already suffered while still in Parliament. On a court order, she was eventually committed to Sunnyside Hospital, a mental asylum. She died there on 23 June 1972. She is buried with her father, Ted Howard, at Bromley Cemetery in Christchurch.

Notes

References

External links

The Howard Papers. University of Otago Library: Hocken Collection

|-

|-

|-

New Zealand Labour Party MPs
Members of the Cabinet of New Zealand
Members of the New Zealand House of Representatives
Christchurch City Councillors
Women government ministers of New Zealand
New Zealand trade unionists
Australian emigrants to New Zealand
1894 births
1972 deaths
New Zealand MPs for Christchurch electorates
Burials at Bromley Cemetery
20th-century New Zealand politicians
20th-century New Zealand women politicians
Women members of the New Zealand House of Representatives
Members of district health boards in New Zealand